Quincy Jones (real name Quami Wallen; born June 2, 1984) is an American stand-up comedian who rose to fame when his dying wish of recording a comedy special was granted.

Early life 
Jones graduated from Middle College High School in the Northgate neighborhood of Seattle, Washington in 2002. He was inspired to become a stand up comedian by watching Chris Rock. He began performing comedy in 2006, and six years later moved to Los Angeles to pursue comedy full-time. He estimates that in one year, he performed stand up over 1,000 times.

Diagnosis and comedy special 
In August 2015, Jones was diagnosed with Stage IV mesothelioma and given one year to live. He began receiving treatment with chemotherapy. Friends set up a Kickstarter campaign to raise money to produce a stand-up special starring Jones, and his story went viral after he appeared on Ellen. After successfully raising over $50,000, Jones filmed a comedy special at the Teragram Ballroom in Los Angeles on April 4, 2016, titled Burning the Light, and it aired on HBO on June 2. Jones said in 2021 that he was planning a second special titled "Still Here" which he planned to record and release in 2021.

References

Living people
Comedians from Washington (state)
African-American stand-up comedians
American stand-up comedians
Place of birth missing (living people)
African-American male comedians
American male comedians
Comedians from California
1984 births
21st-century American comedians
21st-century African-American people
20th-century African-American people